The 2015 Mid-Eastern Athletic Conference men's basketball tournament took place March 9–14, at the Norfolk Scope in Norfolk, Virginia. 2015 marked the third year in Norfolk after the last eight years in Winston-Salem, North Carolina. The top 12 teams in the final standings qualified for the tournament. The champion received a bid to the 2015 NCAA tournament. Florida A&M was ineligible for postseason play due to failing to meet the academic requirements.

Seeds

Bracket

References

2014–15 Mid-Eastern Athletic Conference men's basketball season
MEAC men's basketball tournament
2015 in sports in Virginia
Basketball competitions in Norfolk, Virginia
College basketball tournaments in Virginia